National Highway 519 (NH 519) is a  National Highway in India. It connects  Sikandara and Bhognipur in Uttar Pradesh.

References

National highways in India
National Highways in Uttar Pradesh